Noah's Ark was the vessel built by Noah in the Bible and the Quran.

Noah's Ark or Arc can also refer to:

Attractions

Religious theme parks 
 Ark Encounter in Kentucky, USA
 Noah's Ark (Hong Kong), a full-sized interpretation of the biblical Noah's Ark at Ma Wan Park, Hong Kong

Nonreligious theme parks 
 Noah's Ark Water Park, Wisconsin Dells, United States
 Noah's Ark Animal Sanctuary, an American exotic animal rescue center
 Noah's Ark Zoo Farm, an animal park in Somerset, UK
 Noah's Ark (fun house), an amusement park attraction from the early 20th century

Films
Noah's Ark (1928 film), a Warner Bros. film with talking sequences and a synchronized score
Father Noah's Ark, a 1933 Walt Disney Silly Symphonies short
Noah's Ark (1959 film), a Walt Disney short film featuring stop motion animation effects
Noah's Ark (miniseries), a 1999 TV miniseries starring Jon Voight
Noah's Ark (2007 film) (El Arca), an Argentine animated movie
Noah's Arc: Jumping the Broom, a 2008 film based on the LOGO television series Noah's Arc

Television series
Noah's Arc (TV series), a drama centered on a group of gay black men
Noah's Ark, a 1956 TV series starring Paul Burke as a veterinarian
Noah's Ark (British TV series), about a country vet
Noah's Ark, a 2015 VeggieTales video

Games
Noah's Ark (game), by PopCap Games
Noah's Ark (video game), a Europe-only 1992 NES game published by Konami

Literature
Noah's Ark (Spier book), a 1977 children's picture book by Peter Spier
Noah's Ark (Pinkney book), a 2002 children's picture book by Jerry Pinkney

Other uses
Noah's Ark (album), by the band CocoRosie
Noah's Ark (Poulakis), a 17th-century painting by Theodore Poulakis
Noah's Ark Trap, a chess opening
Operation Noah's Ark, an Israeli action in 2002
Noah's Ark, nickname of a former roof extension of Mansion House in the City of London
 Noah's ark or Noah's ark shell, the common name of Arca noae, a marine bivalve mollusk
 Noah's Ark silver coins, Armenian bullion coins, issued since 2011
 Noah's Ark, a hamlet to the south of Kemsing in Kent, England

See also
Noah's Ark replicas and derivatives
 Johan's Ark, a full-sized interpretation of the biblical Noah's Ark at Dordrecht, Netherland
"Noah and the Ark", an episode of Mel-O-Toons
:Category:Noah's Ark in popular culture